An augustalis or augustale, also agostaro, was a gold coin minted in the Kingdom of Sicily beginning in 1231. It was issued by Frederick II, Holy Roman Emperor (from 1220) and King of Sicily (from 1198), and was minted until his death in 1250. In addition, a half augustalis was issued. It was identical in design, but smaller and half the weight. The augustalis bore a Latin inscription and was widely circulated in Italy. It was patterned after the Roman aureus. It was struck at Brindisi and Messina with accompanying billon deniers. The style of the augustalis has been described as splendid and proto-Renaissance; the quality of its execution and its fineness was high. The augustalis had a nominal weight of 5.31 grams and was 20 carats (854/1000) fine. The legal value was a quarter of a Sicilian gold ounce.

The obverse contains a classical (not medieval) profile bust of the emperor wearing a laureate wreath with the legend CESAR AVG IMP ROM (Caesar Augustus, Emperor of the Romans); the reverse shows an eagle, the imperial symbol, with the name FRIDE RICVS (Frederick). The name augustalis means literally "of the august one", referring to the coin's provenance from the emperor himself, but also linking it with the Roman Emperor, who was commonly styled Augustus.

References

External links 
  An augustalis at the Kunsthistorisches Museum Vienna
 A half augustalis at the American Numismatic Society
  - comprehensive study

Gold coins
Medieval currencies
Medieval Latin inscriptions
13th century in the Kingdom of Sicily
Currencies of Italy
Messina
Brindisi
Frederick II, Holy Roman Emperor